Energy in the United Arab Emirates  describes energy and electricity production, consumption and import in the United Arab Emirates (UAE). UAE has 7% of global proved oil reserves, about 100 billion barrels. Primary energy use in 2009 in UAE was 693 TWh and 151 TWh per million persons.

The UAE is currently transitioning from an electricity generation system nearly 100% powered by gas power plants (2010) to 100% powered by solar, other renewables and nuclear in order to substantially reduce its carbon emissions. It is also rolling out electric vehicle charging infrastructure.

Overview

Oil production 

In June 2010 UAE had 6th top global proved oil  reserves, about 100 billion barrels, behind Saudi Arabia, Venezuela, Iran, Iraq and Kuwait. The crude oil production of UAE was more than 4 and less than 5 million barrels daily.

UAE was 4th top crude oil net exporter (108 Mt in 2008) and 10th top crude oil producers (120 Mt in 2009).

Gas production
UAE has 7th top global proved natural gas reserves, above 6 trillion cubic metres. The global gas production in 2009 was 3 trillion cubic meters.

Solar

The UAE has massive solar generation potential, and its energy policy has shifted substantially due to the declining price of solar. The Dubai Clean Energy Strategy aims to provide 7 per cent of Dubai's energy from clean energy sources by 2020. It will increase this target to 25 per cent by 2030 and 75 per cent by 2050.

Nuclear 

The UAE is installing nuclear power plants to meet its electricity needs. It has signed an agreement with the U.S. on nuclear cooperation, and is also a signatory to the nuclear non-proliferation treaty. As of March, 2020, only one reactor (out of 4) in Barakah nuclear power plant is finished, and loaded with fuel, with expected start of operation in the 2020. Once all 4 reactors are fully operational they will provide about 5600 MW, or about 25% of electricity energy in United Arab Emirates.

As of August 2020, unit 1 is operational, and as of September 2021, unit 2 is operational. Unit 3 became operational in February 2023.

Climate change 
United Arab Emirates was 6th top carbon dioxide emitter per capita in the world in 2009: 40.31 tonnes per capita. Top countries were (tonnes/capita): Gibraltar 152, U.S. Virgin Islands 114, Qatar 80, Netherlands Antilles 51 and Bahrain 43. All emissions from building and cement production are local but some people may argue that some United Arab Emirates produced fuels and/or goods are consumed abroad. The UAE has begun acting aggressively to reduce its carbon emissions. Dubai Electricity and Water Authority (DEWA) plans a 250 MW pumped-storage hydroelectricity at Hatta using  of water and 300 meter above a lower dam.

UAE is planning to generate half of its electrical energy by 2050 from solar and nuclear sources, targeting 44% renewables, 38% gas, 12% clean coal, and 6% nuclear energy sources.

The UAE intends to introduce electrification into the vehicle park. By 2030, the UAE wants to have 40.000 electric cars on its roads. As of September 2020, there were only 1.900 electric cars registered in the UAE.

See also 

 List of power stations in the United Arab Emirates
 Abu Dhabi National Oil Company
 Abu Dhabi Water Supply 
 Dubai Electricity and Water Authority
 Sharjah Electricity and Water Authority

References